The following list includes notable people who were born or have lived in Adrian, Michigan.

Academics and engineering 

 William James Beal, botanist; co-founder of Collegeville (later known as East Lansing); born in Adrian 
 Norman Bel Geddes, theatrical and industrial designer (1939 New York World's Fair pavilion "Futurama"); born in Adrian 
 Myrtle Craig Mowbray, educator and first African American woman to graduate from the Michigan Agricultural College in 1907; born in Adrian
 Garry Wills, prolific Pulitzer Prize-winning American author, journalist, and historian, grew up in Adrian

Business 

 Orville D. Merillat, founder of Merillat Kitchens, later Merillat Industries; moved to Adrian as a young man

Media and music 

 Kirk Baily, (1963–2022), actor
 Priscilla Bonner (1899-1996) Silent Screen movie star grew up in Adrian.
 Byron Darnton, war correspondent for the New York Times during World War II; born in Adrian
 Margaret Wynne Lawless (1847–1926) poet, author, educator, philanthropist
 Allen Lee Haff, television personality (Auction Hunters); born in Adrian
 Matt Noveskey, bass player for Blue October; born in Adrian
 James Royce Shannon (1881–1946), composer and lyricist; born in Adrian

Politics and law 

 Fernando C. Beaman, former U.S. Congressman; lived in Adrian and was mayor in 1856
 Jerome B. Chaffee, U.S. Senator from Colorado; lived in Adrian where he was a teacher and local businessman
 Thomas M. Cooley, 25th Chief Justice of the Michigan Supreme Court; lived in Adrian
 Charles Croswell, 17th Governor of Michigan; lived in Adrian
 William L. Greenly, fifth Governor of Michigan; lived in Adrian
 Chris Gregoire, 22nd Governor of Washington; born in Adrian
 Haviland H. Lund, inspector of home settlement projects for the United States Department of the Interior; born in Adrian

Crime  

 Sile Doty, infamous criminal gang leader; lived in Adrian

Sports

Baseball 

 Rube Kisinger (1876–1941), pitcher for the Detroit Tigers; born in Adrian
 Mike Marshall (1943-2021), pitcher with 9 different Major League Baseball teams; 2× All-Star (1974, 1975); recipient of the Cy Young Award (1974); born in Adrian
 Frank Navin (1871–1935), principal owner of the Detroit Tigers (1909–1935); vice president and acting president of the American League; born in Adrian

Coaching 

 William Reid, basketball player, led Adrian High School to 1912 state title, coach at Colgate University, NCAA administrator and member of Basketball Hall of Fame
 Dale R. Sprankle, championship coach at Adrian College

Football 

 Marcus Benard, linebacker for Arizona Cardinals; born in Adrian
 Kellen Davis, tight end for New York Jets, formerly for Detroit Lions, Seattle Seahawks, Chicago Bears and Cleveland Browns; born in Adrian
 Dorne Dibble, wide receiver for the Detroit Lions; 2x NFL Champion (1953, 1957); born in Adrian
 John Maulbetsch, All-American football halfback; played for Adrian College in 1911
 Bob Westfall (1919–1980), All-American football fullback; played for Michigan 1939–1941; played for Detroit Lions 1945 All-pro; inducted into the College Football Hall of Fame in 1987; lived in Adrian

Military
 John Hack, awarded the Medal of Honor; grew up in Adrian and joined the Union Army there

References

Adrian
Adrian